Douglas Haig McAvoy (29 November 1918 – 15 April 1988) was a Scottish footballer who played as an inside forward for Kilmarnock, Liverpool and Queen of the South. His career was interrupted by World War II; prior to its outbreak he finished on the losing side (after a replay) in the 1938 Scottish Cup Final, and was selected for a Scottish Football Association tour of North America in the summer of 1939 (the fixtures  of which did not include any official internationals).

References

External links
 
 LFC History profile

1918 births
1988 deaths
Footballers from Kilmarnock
Scottish footballers
Association football inside forwards
Cumnock Juniors F.C. players
Liverpool F.C. players
Kilmarnock F.C. players
Queen of the South F.C. players
Scottish Football League players
Scottish Junior Football Association players
English Football League players
Association football scouts